Greeeen (stylized as GReeeeN) is a Japanese vocal group from Kōriyama in Fukushima Prefecture, comprising the all-male four members: HIDE, navi, 92 (read as "kuni"), and SOH.

They made their debut with Universal Music in 2007. Their logo image is of a mouthful of teeth, and the four "e" indicate the number of members and the dentition that you can see when you smile because of all of them were graduated from the Faculty of Dentistry. The sound production is handled by HIDE's older brother JIN, a former guitarist of Pay money To my Pain. 
According to their website at Universal Music Japan, their catch phrase is "Rock 'n' Breakbeats with four microphones".

One notable characteristic is that none of the members have ever shown their faces in the public sphere as a part of GReeeeN, whether in their promotional videos, CDs, television performances, or the Internet. In their only performance on TV-U Fukushima's music show Music Bar Palo Palo (broadcast on January 19, 2007), the group even went as far as censoring their faces during the performance. The members' identities are still unknown, as their faces have never been made public. At first, the group stated that they would wait until all of the members passed the 2009 dental license exam before revealing their faces, but later in late 2009, they indicated that they will still keep their identities secret to avoid any interference with their careers as dentists.

All members studied at the dentistry department at Ohu University in Koriyama City, (Fukushima Prefecture) and the group debuted while still in school in 2007. In 2010, all members get a dental license and work as dentist in Kōriyama. In 2019, they were named as 'Frontier Ambassadors' for Kōriyama city.
In 2013, GReeeeN was announced in the text on the CD that HIDE and navi will travel to Hokkaido. 92 will travel to Okinawa and SOH is still working in Kōriyama.

History

2002–2005: Formation and career beginnings
HIDE began his music career as a member of a Japanese hardcore band in his junior high school.  HIDE and navi formed duo "GReeeN" (The name was three e's sequence at that time) in 2002. Their music was influenced under Western rock bands such as Sublime and Sugar Ray. However, the group was renamed "Greeeen" in 2004 when 92 and Soh joined the group. Soh was a fan of hip hop and reggae. 92 came from Okinawa Prefecture and had his musical roots in Okinawan music.

2006–2007: Debut and career breakthrough
After the group independently released their  self-titled EP, Greeeen on February 14, 2006, Universal Music Japan recruited them in March 2006. They were signed under Nayutawave Records, a subsidiary label of Universal Music Japan. They debuted with the single "Michi" on January 24, 2007.

"Ai Uta" was released as their third single on May 16, 2007. It debuted and peaked at #2 on the Oricon Daily Singles Chart. It debuted at #8 on the Oricon Weekly Singles Chart and eventually peaked at #2 in its sixth week on the weekly chart. The song was certified Two Million by the Recording Industry Association of Japan  (RIAJ) for 2,000,000 full-track ringtone digital downloads (Chaku-Uta Full).

Their debut album, A, Domo. Hajimemashite, was released on June 28, 2007. It debuted at #2 on the Oricon Weekly Albums Chart. The album was certified Triple Platinum by RIAJ for shipment of 750,000 copies.

2008–2009: Rise of popularity

"Kiseki" was released as their seventh single on May 28, 2008, and was used as a theme song for the drama, Rookies. 
It topped the Oricon Weekly Singles Chart and sold over 500,000 copies. The song was also certified Two Million by the RIAJ for 2,000,000 full-track ringtone digital downloads (Chaku Uta Full). 
The song topped the Billboard Japan Hot 100 Year-End 2008 Chart. 
The song was certified Four Million by RIAJ for 4,000,000 single track downloads.

Their second album A, Domo. Ohisashiburi Desu. was released on June 25, 2008, and debuted at #1 on Oricon Weekly Albums Chart, beating out Ayaka's second album Sing to the Sky (2008). The album was certified Million by RIAJ for shipment of one million copies.

Greeeen and Back-On formed supergroup Bareeeeeeeeeen, which released single "Ashiato" on October 1, 2008.

On March 11, 2009, A monument "GReeeeN's Door" with a musical motif is installed in the station square of JR East Kōriyama station.

Their follow-up singles "Tobira", "Ayumi", "Setsuna" and "Haruka" were certified Gold by RIAJ for shipments of 100,000 copies each. Their song "Haruka" debuted at the number-one position on the RIAJ Digital Track Chart. The song was certified Million by RIAJ for 1,000,000 full-track ringtone digital downloads (Chaku Uta Full).

Their third album Shio, Koshō was released on June 10, 2009, and debuted at #1 on the Oricon Weekly Albums Chart with the first-week sales of over 452,000 copies. It became their second album to be certified Million by RIAJ.

On June 29, 2009, the Guinness World Records certified their song "Kiseki" as the "best selling download single in Japan" with the full-track ringtone download sales of 2,301,674 copies of May 24, 2009.

Greeeen released their greatest hits double album Ima Made no A Men, B Men Dest!? on November 25, 2009. On November 5, 2009, an article of Nikkan Sports suggested that GReeeeN would disband after the release of the album. Hide wrote on his blog that the rumours were false. On November 5, the official statement by Universal Music Japan also said that the report was false and that GReeeeN would still be releasing music after the release of the album Imamade no A Men, B Men Desuto!?.

It was announced that Greeeen would be teaming up with Hudson Soft to create music for 2009 DS game. Hudson x GReeeeN Live!? DeeeeS!? was released on April 1, 2010, as their collaboration effort with Hudson Soft.

2011–2012: Return in music and Green boy project
"Every" was released at  Chaku-Uta on April 12, 2011, as their first song since "Haruka" (2009). It was used for Asahi Beer commercials. The song was included as a B-side for their single, "Hana Uta" released on June 22, 2011.

"Green boys" was released on May 6, 2011, and was used as the theme song for the NHK documentary show Athlete no Tamashii. It was part of the "Green boys project" to help the victims of the 2011 Tohoku earthquake and tsunami. In that day, GReeeeN also announced the start of the "Green boys project" by handwriting. 
At that time, all members of GReeeeN, who witnessed the damage caused by the 2011 Tohoku earthquake and tsunami in their hometown of Fukushima, started this project with the idea that "At this moment, music may be able to help relax, warm, or encourage someone." 
GReeeeN launched the "Green boys project" with two challenges. First, "Green boys" will be distributed free of charge for a limited time (until September 30, 2011), as well as Japanese, English, Spanish, Chinese, Taiwanese, and Korean. Second, They started to make a music video of "Green boys" with everyone's feeling from solicit photos.

2013–2016: Departure from Kōriyama
In 2013, GReeeeN was announced in the text on the CD that HIDE and navi will travel to Hokkaido. 92 will travel to Okinawa and SOH is still working in Kōriyama.

In 2014, the band released their sixth studio album, "Ima kara Oyayubi ga Kieru Tejina Shimasu." One single released from the album, "Shinobi", was used as the opening theme for the Japanese dub of Teenage Mutant Ninja Turtles. All four members of the band were fans of the cartoon and expressed their excitement when they would be performing the opening theme for it.

In March 2015, whiteeeen debuts as a sister group of GReeeeN with a single, "Aiuta~since 2007~ (愛唄〜since 2007〜)". 
In April 2015, GReeeeN was adopted for the departure melody of the Shinkansen and conventional lines at JR East Kōriyama station (Fukushima Prefecture), "Kiseki" will be played on the Shinkansen platform, and "Tobira" will be played on the conventional line platform. 
In March 2016, They released first novel "It's Kiseki ~The Story of GReeeeN~ (それってキセキ〜GReeeeNの物語〜)".

In July 2015, "GReeeeN" first official app released on Google Play and App Store.

2017–present: 10th Anniversary and new beginning
On January 7, 2017, 10th Anniversary Live "あっ、リーナ、ども。はじめまして。『クリビツテンギョウ!? ル〜デル〜デ♪ 』" held at Saitama Super Arena. On January 24, 2017, GReeeeN released "ALL SINGLeeeeS ~& New Beginning~" that is the greatest hits compilation album of GReeeeN.

Public image
As 2021, the members' identities are still unknown, as their faces have never been made public. At first, the group stated that they would wait until all of the members passed the 2009 dental license exam before revealing their faces, but later in late 2009, they indicated that they will still keep their identities secret to avoid any interference with their careers as dentists. There is no media appearance in which the members' real faces can be seen, and no members have appeared in the jacket promotion video.

Appearance on TV program
GReeeeN was a studio guest appearance on TV-U Fukushima "MUSIC BARパロパロ" broadcast on January 19, 2007. At that time, They appeared with his face hidden on drawing paper.

HIDE, GReeeeN leader, who participated in the inspection work of the 2011 Great East Japan Earthquake, revealed the situation and feelings at that time with a voice-only appearance on TBS 's late-night news program "NEWS23" broadcast on March 3, 2016. At the interview, he said that he must not forget the fading memory that five years have passed since the 2011 earthquake and tsunami, and this is the first time for him to appear in the media in this way.
GReeeeN members (excluding SOH for work) appeared on Fuji TV's morning news program "Mezamashi TV" broadcast on September 14, 2016 (release date of the album " Ren "). It was an appearance in a costume that imaged the members.
December 8, 2016, GReeeeN appeared in a costume on NHK's late-night program "SONGS".

Masaki Suda, who appears in the movie "Kiseki -Anohi no Sobito- (キセキ -あの日のソビト-)" released on January 28, 2017, talked about the live performance and the background of GReeeeN, including the movie's promoter. This is the first time that all the members have performed together.

August 8, 2020, GReeeeN appeared in the special music program "Live Ale" linked to the "NHK with Corona Project". At that time, they appeared in the form of an interview with Teruyoshi Uchimura on the broadcast "Minna de Yale Kickoff Special" on July 9 of the same year. This is the first time they have appeared in a special music program.
GReeeeN participated in the "71st NHK Kouhaku Uta Gassen" on December 31, 2020. This is their first appearance on the show.
Their singing was performed in the NHK Hall, and this is a show that seems to be their "appearance" may be shown.

January 31, 2021 HIDE appeared in a costume as "HIDE-chan (5 years old) from Dakaland" in the derivative program "Wanwan Wanda Land" of NHK education "Peek-a-boo !".
February 15, 2021 Remote appearance on ABC TV "Seki Jam Complete Burn Show". Not all the members, but two representatives, HIDE and navi, will appear. Even on the remote screen, the real face does not appear and only the voice appears, and each of them is illustrated with a 3D character.

Appearance on radio program
Appeared on Nippon Broadcasting System "Terry Ito Notteke Radio (テリー伊藤のってけラジオ)" on May 1, 2007.

On August 6, 2014, GReeeeN appeared on a radio program for the first time in seven years in Fukushima FM 20th Anniversary Special!, "GReeeeN is here !! HAPPY LOVE SMILE Festival !!". In order to avoid confusion in the broadcast, it was a radio appearance from a special studio away from the Fukushima FM headquarters.

On August 19, 2016, the first national broadcast "GReeeeN's All Night Nippon Gold" was broadcast.

On February 22, 2017, he made his first appearance in "SCHOOL OF LOCK!".

"MISIA and GReeeeN HIDE's All Night Nippon" will be broadcast on January 4, 2019, at midnight (January 5) . It was the first media co-star of MISIA and HIDE who collaborated on "Aino Katachi feat. HIDE (GReeeeN)" .

On March 30, 2020, members HIDE and 92 will appear as the first guests of the new program "Rajiru Lab" on NHK Radio 1.
On October 25 and November 1, 2020, HIDE made a guest appearance in "Toshio Suzuki's Studio Ghibli Sweaty".
On December 5, 2020, regular broadcasting of "92ラジ" (Saturday 17:00-17:30), in which 92 serves as a personality, will start on RBCi Radio, a broadcasting station in Okinawa Prefecture.

Musical activities

About composition
Since GReeeeN is a vocalist for all four, They use a computer (HIDE uses GarageBand ) for band sounds, etc. , and record songs in a karaoke state. On HIDE's blog, you can see that his brother JIN is composing using a computer. When HIDE and navi were working together in the very early days, there was a time when they were recording songs as vocals with the cooperation of JIN's band. The style of the song at that time was mixture rock, which was extremely hard and heavy, reflecting their hobbies. I started listening to Western music mixture such as SUBLIME and SUGAR RAY, but HIDE and navi at that time said that they were going to make a mixture because their roots were pop music.

However, when SOH joined in 2004 and became the new GReeeeN, GReeeeN music that fused the sensibilities of four people such as rock band sound, breakbeats, hip hop, reggae, and J-POP. It will be established. In particular, the debut single "Michi" is a song that symbolizes GReeeeN music, and is a song created by the fusion of breakbeats and band sounds, the piano, the sad melody, and the harmony of the four voices.

Among the current GReeeeN songs, the debut single "Michi" is written and composed by HIDE, and the coupling "Kizuna" is written by HIDE and composed by JIN. Other songs are written and composed under the name of GReeeeN. However, on the HIDE's blog, "I think that if you listen to the album, you will understand it, but there are times when the person who is in each song sings in a jumbled manner with the pattern of taking lead vocals. ~ ”, so it's unclear who the members are writing and composing. Actually, "DREAM" recorded in "HIGH GK LOW ~ Hajikero ~" and the album "Ā, Domo. Ohisashiburi Desu." "SUN SHINE !!!" "Matane" "Sayonara Kara Hajimeyou", "Tobira", etc. are lead vocals by navi.

About lyrics
GReeeeN is also known for writing lyrics as well as composing. The characteristic of GReeeeN's poetry is "a message that appeals straight to the listener's heart." It is also a feature of "GReeeeN Music" mentioned in the previous section.

In particular, the simplicity as a result of pursuing "to tell people" is in a form that listeners can sympathize with.

navi once said that, "Each person has their own situation and environment, but I think the form that people can sympathize with most is like GReeeeN. Using lyrics and melody as communication, that It's the moment when I get a response by linking with the situation of the person who listens to it, which is the moment that I think is the most amazing as a creator. So it's easy to understand, straightforward, and it gives the listener an opportunity to overlap with their own situation. I think the words are good." Also, from the letter of leader HIDE, it was found that 92 said some words of the lyrics.

Discography

Studio albums

Compilation albums

Live albums

Singles

Awards

Japan Gold Disc Awards

|-
| rowspan="2"|2007
| Greeeen
| New Artist of the Year
| 
|-
| "Ai Uta"
| Chaku-Uta Song of the Year
| 
|-
| rowspan="3"|2008
| rowspan="2"|"Kiseki"
| The Best 10 Single
|
|-
| Chaku-Uta Song of the Year
| 
|-
| "A, Domo. Ohisashiburi Desu."
| The Best 10 Album
| 
|-
| rowspan="3"|2009
| "Haruka"
| Song of the Year
| 
|-
| "Shio, Koshō"
| The Best 5 Album
| 
|-
| "Ima Made no A Men, B Men Dest!?"
| The Best 5 Album
|

Japan Record Awards

|-
| rowspan="2"|2009
| rowspan="2"|Shio, Koshō
| Best Album
| 
|-
| Album Award
|

Student Voice Awards

|-
| 2008
| "Kiseki"
| Best Ringtone
|

Yahoo! Music Awards

|-
| 2008
| "Ai Uta"
| Works category
|

Films

Video game
A Mobiclip powered videogame based on the band called  was developed and released by Hudson Soft on April 1, 2010.

Notes

References

External links
  
 Public Website by Universal Music Japan 

Japanese rock music groups
Japanese pop music groups
Universal Music Japan artists
Stardust Promotion artists
Musical groups from Fukushima Prefecture
Japanese boy bands
Masked musicians